The white-lored spinetail (Synallaxis albilora) is a species of bird in the family Furnariidae. It is found in Bolivia, Brazil, and Paraguay. Its natural habitats are subtropical or tropical moist lowland forests and heavily degraded former forest.

References

white-lored spinetail
Birds of the Pantanal
white-lored spinetail
Taxonomy articles created by Polbot